Ralph H. Lyman (1883 – March 15, 1954) was an American music professor. He was the head of Pomona College's department of music from 1917 to 1948.

References

American conductors (music)
1883 births
1954 deaths
Grinnell College alumni
Pomona College faculty
20th-century American musicologists